David McGill (born 24 October 1981) is an Irish retired footballer.

Playing career

Youth and college 
McGill played his entire youth career from Under 8's and up with Manortown United.  With Manortown, he won both league and cup titles as well as being named the Club Man of the Year while with the Under 16's.

At Charlotte 
He eventually decided to attend college in the US, enrolling at the University of North Carolina at Charlotte in 2000.  McGill made an instant impact with the Charlotte 49ers, appearing in 18 games, starting 17 of those.  He scored 1 goal, assisted on 7 others, en route to score 9 points on the season.  His 7 assists lead the team.

His second season with the team in 2001 wasn't as productive, with him playing in 20 games while only starting 14 of them.  He scored 1 goal and had 3 assists for a total of 5 points.  His 3 assists were good enough to tie him for the team lead.

With the 49ers, McGill scored 2 goals and 10 assists for 14 points.  He was named to Conference USA's All Freshman Team in 2000 as well as being named to the Second Team All-Conference USA.  In addition, he was the MVP of the 2000 Puma Classic.  Following the completion of the 2001 season, McGill sought to transfer schools and left UNC Charlotte for UC Santa Barbara.

At UC Santa Barbara 
McGill enrolled at the University of California, Santa Barbara for his junior year in 2002.  With the UC Santa Barbara men's soccer team, McGill played in 21 games, starting 20 of them.  He netted 3 times, assisted on 15 others for 21 points.  He was named to the Second Team All-Big West Conference and his assist total was good for 5th in the nation and 2nd in the conference, trailing teammate Memo Arzate's 18.  He also assisted on UC Santa Barbara's first ever NCAA post season goal when he passed to Rob Friend against the University of San Diego.

His second season was just as productive as the first, appearing in 18 games and starting 17 of them. He registered another 9 assists. The team, again, made the post season but lost to Cal in the 2nd Round.  However, McGill's performances had professionals taking note. The Los Angeles Galaxy drafted him in the 2004 MLS SuperDraft.  He went in the 4th round, 33rd overall. Despite the honour, McGill passed on Major League Soccer, instead opting to sign with Dublin City in his native Ireland.

Professional

Dublin City & Mount Merrion 
McGill returned to Ireland in 2004 and joined League of Ireland Premier Division side Dublin City.  McGill broke into the Vikings first team upon his return, but was one of 14 players released by new Vikings boss Roddy Collins in a mid-season cull for the League of Ireland Premier Division strugglers. McGill joined Leinster Senior League side Mount Merrion YMCA for the remainder of the 2004 season before rejoining Dublin City for the 2005 season. That season, McGill helped the Vikings to promotion to the League of Ireland Premier Division after scoring Dublin City's winning goal in the first leg of a two-legged play-off victory over Shamrock Rovers. McGill remained at Dublin City for the 2006 season as part of their League of Ireland Premier Division campaign until the Vikings went out of existence due severe financial issues in July 2006.

Shamrock Rovers 
McGill did not wait long to find a new club when he joined League of Ireland First Division leaders Shamrock Rovers. A lifelong Rovers fan, he made his debut for the club on 28 July 2006 against Athlone Town at St. Mels Park in a 3–0 victory for the Hoops and went to win the First Division with two goals in fourteen appearances.  He made a total of 29 appearances scoring twice in his time at the Hoops.

Mount Merrion & Shelbourne 
McGill departed Rovers in August 2007 and he rejoined his former club Mount Merrion YMCA later that month. McGill's second stint at Mount Merrion was again short-lived when he made a return to League of Ireland First Division action by signing for Shelbourne on 29 November 2007. McGill made his Shelbourne debut in a scoreless draw against Dundalk at Tolka Park on 7 March 2008. He scored his first Shelbourne goal during a 1–0 victory over Wexford Youths at Tolka Park on 17 October 2008. During the 2011 season he was injured against Salthill Devon ruling him out for the rest of the season.

Honours 
League of Ireland First Division: 1
 Shamrock Rovers – 2006
Leinster Senior Cup: 1
 Shelbourne – 2010

References

External links 

 
 
 Mount Merrion YMCA player profile
 
 UC Santa Barbara player profile
 

1981 births
Living people
Association footballers from Dublin (city)
Association football midfielders
Republic of Ireland association footballers
League of Ireland players
Shelbourne F.C. players
Shamrock Rovers F.C. players
Dublin City F.C. players
UC Santa Barbara Gauchos men's soccer players
Charlotte 49ers men's soccer players
LA Galaxy draft picks
Leinster Senior League (association football) players
People educated at Synge Street CBS